La Mure is a commune in the Isère département in southeastern France.

Population

Sights
 The Chemin de fer de la Mure is a small touristic train using a railway initially built for the transportation of coal between Saint-Georges-de-Commiers and La Mure. The line was inaugurated on 24 July 1888.
 The Arboretum de Combe Noire is a nearby arboretum created by teachers and staff

Personalities
Saint Pierre-Julien Eymard, Roman Catholic priest founder of Congregation of the Blessed Sacrament and canonized in 1962, was born in la Mure on 4 February 1811.

Neighbouring communes
 Prunières
 Sousville
 Susville
 Ponsonnas
 Pierre-Châtel
 Saint-Honoré

International relations

La Mure is twinned with Marktredwitz, Germany.

See also

Communes of the Isère department
 Route Napoléon

References

External links

La Mure official site in French
Site of the plateau matheysin in French
Site of the La Mure train and railway
La Mure official tourism office in French

Communes of Isère
Arpitania
Dauphiné
Isère communes articles needing translation from French Wikipedia